Nizamettin is the Turkish version of the Muslim name Nizam al-Din. It may refer to:

Nizamettin Arıç (born 1956), Kurdish singer
Nizamettin Çalışkan (born 1987), Turkish footballer
Nizamettin Erkmen (1919 - 1990), Turkish politician
Nizamettin Tas (born 1961), Turkish military commander

Turkish masculine given names